Khazar myth may refer to
 Khazar hypothesis of Ashkenazi ancestry
 Khazar hypothesis of Cossack ancestry
 An element of Khazar mythology